Vytautas Černiauskas (born 12 March 1989 in Panevėžys) is a Lithuanian international footballer who plays as a goalkeeper for FK Panevėžys.

Career
He played for four seasons at FC Vaslui, in Romanian Liga I.

In 2016 Černiauskas signed contract with Cyprian club Ermis Aradippou, but he left team in December due to a disagreement with club director.

On 22 February 2017 Vytautas Černiauskas returned to the Dinamo București as a replacement for the injured Laurențiu Brănescu. He left the club after the victory of 2016–17 Cupa Ligii.

On 30 June 2017, he signed a 2-year contract with Bulgarian First League club CSKA Sofia. Černiauskas signed another 2-year contract extension on 14 January 2019 and sat on the bench.

Statistics
Statistics accurate as of match played 11 September 2019

Honours

FK Ekranas
A Lyga: 2008, 2009, 2010
Lithuanian Cup: 2010

SC Vaslui
Liga I runner-up: 2011–12

FC Dinamo București
Cupa României runner-up: 2015–16
Cupa Ligii: 2016–17

CSKA Sofia
Bulgarian Cup runner-up: 2019–20

RFS Rigas
Virslīga: 2021
Latvian Cup: 2021

References

External links 
 
 

1989 births
Living people
Sportspeople from Panevėžys
Lithuanian footballers
Lithuania international footballers
Lithuania under-21 international footballers
Association football goalkeepers
FK Ekranas players
FC Vaslui players
Korona Kielce players
FC Dinamo București players
Ermis Aradippou FC players
PFC CSKA Sofia players
FK RFS players
A Lyga players
Liga I players
Ekstraklasa players
Cypriot First Division players
First Professional Football League (Bulgaria) players
Lithuanian expatriate footballers
Expatriate footballers in Romania
Expatriate footballers in Poland
Expatriate footballers in Cyprus
Expatriate footballers in Bulgaria
Expatriate footballers in Latvia
Lithuanian expatriate sportspeople in Romania
Lithuanian expatriate sportspeople in Poland
Lithuanian expatriate sportspeople in Cyprus
Lithuanian expatriate sportspeople in Bulgaria
Lithuanian expatriate sportspeople in Latvia